Wolfgang Lipp (born 1939, Stuttgart) is a German Lutheran theologian, pastor, university chaplain, academic and historian of art, architecture and culture.

Works

Architecture and cultural history 
 Der Weg nach Santiago - Jakobswege in Süddeutschland, Ulm 1991, 
 Bilder und Meditationen zum Marienportal des Ulmer Münsters, Langenau 1983, .
 Begleiter durch das Ulmer Münster, Langenau 1999, .
 Das Erbe des Jakobus. Zur Vorgeschichte und Geschichte, zur theologischen und religiösen Bedeutung der Jakobuswallfahrt. Mit einem Anhang über die deutschen Pilgerwege. Abbildungen und Fotografien von Fritjof Betz, Rainer Brockmann u.a., C&S Verlag, Laupheim 2008, .

Theology 
 Sterben - Anregungen eines Studientages zum Weiterdenken, edited by Wolfgang Lipp, Armin Vaas Verlag Langenau-Albeck, 1981, 
 Wer ist Gott? - 1. Korinther 13, in: Gottesdienstpraxis "Beerdigung" (ed. Erhard Domay), Gütersloh 1996, S. 103ff, 
 Wo aber der Geist des Herrn ist, da ist Freiheit - Predigten, Reutlingen 1999

Sources
Wolfgang Lipp in the DNB
VIAF on Wolfgang Lipp

German Lutheran theologians
German academics
German art historians
German architectural historians
Cultural historians
20th-century German Lutheran clergy
Clergy from Stuttgart
Living people
1939 births
University and college chaplains in Germany